"The Message" is a song by British funk band Cymande from their self-titled debut studio album Cymande. Written by the group's members Patrick Patterson and Steve Scipio, it was recorded at De Lane Lea Studios in London, produced by John Schroeder, and released as a 7-inch single through Janus Records in 1972. Released as a lead single, the song peaked at No. 48 on the Billboard Hot 100 and No. 22 on the Hot R&B/Hip-Hop Songs in the United States.

The song can be heard in Spike Lee's 2002 film 25th Hour and Seth Gordon's 2011 film Horrible Bosses. British reggae group Aswad recorded a cover version of the song for their 1988 studio album Distant Thunder.

A cover of the song was performed by jazz-funk trumpeter Blue Mitchell, and released on his 1973 album, The Last Tango = Blues.

Track listing

Personnel 
 Ray King – vocals, percussion
 Peter Serreo – tenor saxophone
 Michael "Bami" Rose – alto saxophone, flute, bongos
 Pablo Gonsales – Congas
 Sam Kelly – drums
 Joey Dee – vocals, percussion
 Derek Gibbs – alto and soprano saxophone
 Steve Scipio – bass, songwriter
 Patrick Eaton Patterson – guitar, songwriter
 John Schroeder – producer

Charts

Sampled credits 
The song was sampled by several hip hop recording artists, including:

 Ruthless Rap Assassins in "And It Wasn't a Dream" from Killer Album (1990)
 Masta Ace in "Me and the Biz" from Take a Look Around (1990)
 MC Solaar in "Bouge de là" from Qui sème le vent récolte le tempo (1991)
 King Tee in "On tha Rox" from Tha Triflin' Album (1993)
 GRITS in "Fragmentation" from Factors of the Seven (1998)

References

External links 

Funk songs
1972 singles
Song recordings produced by John Schroeder (musician)